Stanley Downer (8 March 1884 – 19 January 1946) was a cricketer. He played in two first-class matches for British Guiana in 1903/04 and 1908/09.

See also
 List of Guyanese representative cricketers

References

External links
 

1884 births
1946 deaths
Cricketers from British Guiana